Johan Carl Kempe (8 December 1884 – 8 July 1967) was leader of the Swedish pulp and paper industry Mo och Domsjö AB (now Holmen Group) and involved in several other companies in the large economic sphere of the Kempe family. He was also a silver medalist in tennis at the 1912 Summer Olympics in Stockholm.

Biography

Carl Kempe was born at Jakobs församling  in Stockholm, Sweden. He was the son of industrialist Frans Kempe (1847-1924) and Eva Charlotta Kempe ( Treffenberg).  He finished secondary school at Norra Latin in Stockholm, studied at Uppsala University 1903–1905 and started to work for Mo och Domsjö in 1906. His father had been employed by the family company since 1875, became its managing director in 1884 and  chairman of the board in 1908. During this period, the company expanded sharply and acquired other operations with sawmills and forest land.  In 1903, the first pulp factory Mo och Domsjö  opened in at  Domsjö in Örnsköldsvik. 
During the first decades of the 20th century, pulp mills were established in Hörnefors and Husum.

Carl Kempe had studied abroad and followed his father on business trips in foreign countries. He succeeded his father as CEO of Mo och Domsjö in 1917.  The company he took over from his father had retained many traits of a traditional lumber producer. During the 1920s,  technical advances in the wood industry had begun and were carried out on a large scale. Chemical laboratories were established  and extensive wood research was initiated. Through large investments in research and development, Carl Kempe was chiefly responsible for its transformation into a modern chemical industry.

Kempe himself claimed that he spent his time at university in Uppsala mostly with playing tennis, attending dancing lessons and playing cards; the first of these pastimes, at least, led to his winning a tennis silver medal at the 1912 Summer Olympics in Stockholm in the men's indoor doubles event together with Gunnar Setterwall  (1881-1928).

In 1917, Carl Kempe bought Ekolsund Manor at Enköping Municipality in Uppsala County. During the period 1928–1930, he had the southern lane restored and modernized according to drawings by actor, art director and architect   Vilhelm Bryde (1888-1974). The estate was used as a residence for his family. He had shown  an interest in Chinese art since the 1920s and filled  the manor house with Chinese artifacts. 
Shortly before his death in 1967, Kempe left Ekolsund to the daughters of his second marriage.

Personal life
Carl Kempe married Helfrid Ingeborg Margareta  Hammarberg (1885-1975) in 1919.   He was married in 1934 to  Aagot Marianne Axell. He was the father of five children.
He died during 1967 at Enköping in Uppsala County.

See also
Holmen (company)

References

Bibliography
Gunnar Unger, "Kempe, Johan Carl", Svenskt biografiskt lexikon, Vol. 21 (1975–1977), pp. 58–60External links

Holmen Group website

1884 births
1967 deaths
Businesspeople from Stockholm
20th-century Swedish businesspeople
Swedish industrialists
Tennis players from Stockholm
Swedish male tennis players
Olympic tennis players of Sweden
Tennis players at the 1912 Summer Olympics
Olympic silver medalists for Sweden
Olympic medalists in tennis
Medalists at the 1912 Summer Olympics